Ronald Stanley Triner (24 December 1917 – 6 May 1943) was a New Zealand road cyclist. He was killed in an air crash during World War II. 
  
In the 1938 British Empire Games he competed in the Road Race, and he was a New Zealand cycling champion.

He was born in Auckland, and was a radio mechanic with Radio (1936) Ltd. He enlisted in the Royal New Zealand Air Force in 1939. In 1943 he was the navigator of a Hudson aircraft that crashed on takeoff from Waipapakauri in Northland for an antisubmarine patrol. Pilot Officer Triner and Sergeant William Nicholls were both killed.

References

External links 
 

1917 births
1943 deaths
New Zealand male cyclists
Commonwealth Games competitors for New Zealand
Cyclists at the 1938 British Empire Games
New Zealand military personnel killed in World War II
Royal New Zealand Air Force personnel
Cyclists from Auckland
20th-century New Zealand people